{{DISPLAYTITLE:h1n̥gʷnis}}
h₁n̥gʷnis is the reconstructed Proto-Indo-European name of the fire god in the Proto-Indo-European mythology.

Name 
The archaic Proto-Indo-European language (ca. 4500–4000 BC) had a two-gender system which originally divided words between animate and inanimate, a system used to distinguish a common term from its deified synonym. Therefore, fire as an animate entity and active force was known as *h₁n̥gʷnis, while the inanimate entity and natural substance was named *péh₂ur (cf. Greek pyr; English fire).

In some traditions, as the sacral name of the dangerous fire may have become a word taboo, the stem *h₁n̥gʷnis served as an ordinary term for fire, as in the Latin ignis.

Evidence 
 PIE: *h₁n̥gʷnis, the fire as an active force,
 Indo-Iranian: Hagni-,
 Vedic: Agni (अग्नि), a fire deity,
 Young Avestan: Dāšt-āɣni,
 Balto-Slavic: *ungnis,
 Lithuanian: Ugnis szwenta, 'Holy Fire',
 Latvian: Uguns māte, 'Mother of Fire',
 Proto-Albanian: *agni-,
 Albanian: enjte, 'Thursday'.

See also
 Ognyena Maria

References

Bibliography

Proto-Indo-European deities
Reconstructed words
Proto-Indo-European mythology
Fire gods